Verde is a surname. In Spanish, Portuguese, Italian  and Romanian means "Green". Notable people with this surname include:

Alessandro Verde, Roman Catholic Cardinal
Cristina Verde (born 1950), Mexican engineer
Cuerno Verde, Comanche leader
Dino Verde, Italian author, lyricist, playwright and screenwriter
Gelsomina Verde, Neapolitan victim of the Camorra